The 1905 Cleveland Naps season was a season in American baseball. The team finished fifth in the American League with a record of 76–78, 19 games behind the Philadelphia Athletics. The Naps were 52-29 on July 24th, and held a three game lead in the American League, but they were only 24-49 after that point, and finished two games under .500 after having been 23 games over .500

Regular season

Season standings

Roster

Player stats

Batting

Starters by position 
Note: Pos = Position; G = Games played; AB = At bats; H = Hits; Avg. = Batting average; HR = Home runs; RBI = Runs batted in

Other batters 
Note: G = Games played; AB = At bats; H = Hits; Avg. = Batting average; HR = Home runs; RBI = Runs batted in

Pitching

Starting pitchers 
Note: G = Games pitched; IP = Innings pitched; W = Wins; L = Losses; ERA = Earned run average; SO = Strikeouts

Other pitchers 
Note: G = Games pitched; IP = Innings pitched; W = Wins; L = Losses; ERA = Earned run average; SO = Strikeouts

Relief pitchers 
Note: G = Games pitched; W = Wins; L = Losses; SV = Saves; ERA = Earned run average; SO = Strikeouts

References 

1905 Cleveland Naps season at Baseball Reference

Cleveland Guardians seasons
Cleveland Naps season
1905 in sports in Ohio